Navaridas is a town and municipality located in the province of Álava, in the Basque Country, northern Spain.

References

External links
 NAVARIDAS in the Bernardo Estornés Lasa - Auñamendi Encyclopedia 

Municipalities in Álava